John Henry Luers (September 29, 1819 – June 29, 1871) was an American prelate of the Roman Catholic Church.  He served as the first bishop of the new Diocese of Fort Wayne in Indiana from 1858 until his death in 1871.

Biography

Early life 
Luers was born on September 29, 1819, near Münster in the Kingdom of Westphalia (now part of Germany). His family emigrated to the United States in 1831, settling on a farm near Piqua, Ohio. John Luers worked a store clerk in town.  According to contemporary accounts, Luers, as a young man, was not religious and led a wild life. His father severely admonished him for neglecting his prayers.

In 1835, Luers' outlook towards Catholicism and service to others changed after meeting Archbishop John Baptist Purcell. Luers soon decided to become a priest. Purcell sent him to St. Francis Xavier Seminary in Cincinnati.

Priesthood 
Luers was ordained a priest by Purcell for the Diocese of Cincinnati on November 11, 1846.
 After his ordination, Luers was appointed pastor of St. Joseph's parish in Cincinnati.  While there, he finished construction of the church and constructed several schools while eliminating the parish's debts. It soon became one of the largest and most important German congregations in the city.

Bishop of Fort Wayne 
Pope Pius IX appointed Luers as the first bishop of the Diocese of Fort Wayne on September 22, 1857.  He was consecrated in Cincinnati, Ohio on January 10, 1858, by Archbishop James Whitfield. "In the evening, at nearby St. Joseph Church, Luers’ parishioners hosted a reception for their longtime pastor. On this occasion, they presented him with a mitre, crosier, pectoral cross, bishop’s cassock, ambry with episcopal seal, three pairs of pontifical shoes, and $1,200." 

In 1863, Luers held a synod of priests in the diocese at the University of Notre Dame in which he established the laws and constitution for the diocese. Luers attended the Second Plenary Council in Baltimore in 1866.

As bishop, Luers founded several new parishes and missions, established an orphanage, and built a cathedral. In 1868, due to the large German-speaking population in the diocese, he invited the Poor Handmaids of Jesus Christ (PHJC) of Dernbach / Westerwald, a German religious order, to come to the diocese. The sisters established St. Joseph Hospital in Fort Wayne in 1869. In 1868, Luers established an orphanage in Rensselaer, Indiana for children who had lost their parent during the American Civil War.

Death and legacy 
In June 1871, during a vacancy of the See of Cleveland, Luers traveled to Cleveland, Ohio, to ordain a seminarian. While returning to the Cleveland train station on June 29th, John Luers suffered a fatal stroke. He was age 51. Bishop Luers is buried in the crypt at the Cathedral of the Immaculate Conception.

At the time of Luers' death, the Diocese of Fort Wayne had 69 priests, 75 churches, ten chapels, one hospital, one orphan asylum, one college, 11 academies for girls, 40 parochial schools, and a Catholic population estimated at 50,000.  The Franciscan Order founded Bishop Luers High School in 1958 in Fort Wayne.

References

External links
Diocese of Fort Wayne-South Bend

19th-century Roman Catholic bishops in the United States
1819 births
1871 deaths
German emigrants to the United States
Roman Catholic Archdiocese of Cincinnati
Roman Catholic bishops of Fort Wayne
Catholics from Indiana